Laura Otis is an American historian of science, and Professor of English, at Emory University.

She graduated from Yale University with a B.S. in Molecular Biophysics and Biochemistry in 1983, and from the University of California, San Francisco with an M.A. in Neuroscience in 1988, and from Cornell University with a Ph.D. in Comparative Literature in 1991.

She is a guest scholar at the Max Planck Institute for the History of Science.

Awards
 2000 MacArthur Fellows Program

Works
 Organic Memory: History and the Body in the Late Nineteenth and Early Twentieth Centuries. Lincoln, NE: University of Nebraska Press, 1994. 
 Membranes: Metaphors of Invasion in Nineteenth-Century Literature, Science, and Politics. Baltimore, MD: JHU Press, 2000, 
 Networking: Communicating with Bodies and Machines in the Nineteenth Century. Ann Arbor, MI: University of Michigan Press, 2001. 
 Translator: Vacation Stories: Five Science Fiction Tales, Santiago Ramon y Cajal, Champaign, IL: University of Illinois Press, 2001. 
 Editor: Literature and Science in the Nineteenth Century: An Anthology, Oxford: Oxford University Press, 2002. 
 Müller's Lab, New York: Oxford University Press US, 2007,

References

20th-century American historians
Yale University alumni
University of California, San Francisco alumni
Cornell University alumni
Emory University faculty
MacArthur Fellows
Living people
American women historians
21st-century American historians
20th-century American women writers
21st-century American women writers
1967 births